Market Hill may be:

 Market Hill, Cambridge, England
 Market Hill, Southam, England
 Markethill, a village in County Armagh, Northern Ireland